Y series or Y-series may refer to:

 Bedford Y series – busses
 IdeaPad Y series – laptop computers
 Sony Vaio Y series – notebook computers
→_→Y-series train – a service class in China

See also
 X series (disambiguation)
 Z series (disambiguation)